Ksenia Mikhailovna Sitnik (born 15 May 1995), sometimes also transliterated as Kseniya Sitnik or Xenia Sitnik, is a Belarusian pop singer. She represented Belarus in the Junior Eurovision Song Contest 2005, which she won with the self-penned song "My vmeste" (We Are Together).

Biography 

Ksenia Sitnik was born on 15 May 1995 in the city of Mazyr. She won first prize at the international children's contest at the Slavianski Bazaar in Vitebsk in July 2005. Sitnik won the Junior Eurovision Song Contest in 2005, where she represented her home country with the song My Vmeste. Despite the song not being particularly popular in pre-contest polls: for example, in the Europrediction poll, Sitnik came last with no points. Sitnik won, albeit narrowly – she had only three points more than the runner-up, Antonio José Sánchez Mazuecos from Spain.

In November 2006, Sitnik released a CD with accompanying music book called My Vmeste ("We Are Together"). She has released three music videos: Malenkiy Korablik ("Little Ship") in 2006, Prostaya Pesenka ("Simple Song") in 2007 and  Non-stop in 2009.

Discography 
My vmeste (2006)
Respublika Kseniya (2010)

See also 
Junior Eurovision Song Contest
Belarus in the Junior Eurovision Song Contest

Notes

References

External links 

Unofficial website
Menu (interviews, photos, videos, links)
French WebSite of Kseniya Sitnik (with lyrics of all Kseniya's songs)

1995 births
Living people
People from Mazyr
Belarusian child singers
Junior Eurovision Song Contest entrants for Belarus
Junior Eurovision Song Contest winners
21st-century Belarusian women singers